Natalia Khoma (Ukrainian: Наталія Хома) is a Ukrainian-born cellist. She is the first and only Ukrainian cellist to become a laureate of the International Tchaikovsky Competition in Moscow, Russia.

Early life and education
Natalia Khoma was born in Lviv, Ukraine. She attended the Solomia Krushelnytska School, and the Moscow Conservatory. She also completed an Artist Diploma from Boston University under the direction of Leslie Parnas.

Career
Khoma made her first public appearance on TV at age ten and performed her first concerto with an orchestra at age thirteen. She has performed as a soloist with the Berlin Radio Orchestra, Moscow Radio Orchestra, Belgrade Philharmonic Orchestra, Budapest Philharmonic Orchestra, Ukrainian National State Symphony Orchestra, Johannesburg Philharmonic Orchestra, Chamber Ensemble of New York City Symphony Orchestra, and the Franz Liszt Chamber Orchestra. She has also performed solo and duo recitals with pianist Volodymyr Vynnytsky.

Khoma is a Professor of Cello at the College of Charleston in Charleston, SC and Director of the Charleston Music Fest. Khoma has been a professor at the Lviv Conservatory in Ukraine, Roosevelt University College of Music in Chicago, Michigan State University and was a visiting professor of the University of Connecticut School of Music. 

For several years, Khoma played a Stradivarius cello. In 2010, Khoma was featured on Gnattali: Solo & Chamber Works For Guitar, for which Marc Regnier was nominated for a Grammy Award for Best Chamber Music Performance. In February 2020, Khoma performed in 18 concerts during a North American tour as a soloist with the National Symphony Orchestra of Ukraine, with management by Columbia Artists.

Awards
 1981 Lysenko All Ukraine Competition (First Prize)
 1985 Budapest Pablo Casals International Competition, Hungary (Diploma)
 1987 Markneukirchen International Cello Competition, (Second Prize) and Max Reger Special Prize, Germany
 1990 Jeunesses Musicales International Cello Competition, Belgrade, Serbia (First Prize)
 1990 International Tchaikovsky Competition, Moscow, Russia (Fourth Prize)

Honors
 2008 Honorary Professor of Lviv National Music Academy, Ukraine
 2010 Honorary Professor of Odesa National Academy of Music, Ukraine
 2015 Honorary Professor of Tchaikovsky National Music Academy of Ukraine
 2015 The Order of Merit for outstanding achievements in the art of music (National Music Academy of Ukraine, Ukraine)

Discography
 1995 Music of Virko Baley “Orpheus singing”, TNC/Cambria Records
 1996 Music of Ami Maayani, IMP
 1996 Music of Adam Khudoyan, Ongaku Records 
 1997 Chamber music of Arensky and Tchaikovsky, Russian Disc
 1998 Music of Schubert and Schumann (Lori Sims, piano), TNC/Cambria Records
 1998 Trios by Lyatoshinsky (Oleh Krysa, violin; Tatiana Chekina, piano) TNC/ Cambria records
 2001 Concertos of Haydn with Kyiv Camerata Chamber Orchestra (Virko Baley, conductor), TNC/Cambria Records
 2002 "Treny", TNC/Cambria Records
 2004 Music of Krommer, Naxos
 2004 Sonatas of Beethoven and Rachmaninov, Blue Griffin Records
 2006 “Dances” (Volodymyr Vynnytsky, piano), Blue Griffin Records
 2006 “DSCH”, Music of Schostakovich, Suoni e Colori, France
 2010 “Sing we now of Christmas”, MSR Classics, Taylor Festival Choir; Robert Taylor, Conductor
 2010 Radames Gnattali, Solo and Chamber Works for Guitar, Marc Regnier, guitar; Dorian sono luminus
 2010 Rachmaninov Trio and Vynnytsky “Lost Tango” (Two Plus One Trio) Centaur Records
 2010 Sonatas of Brahms and Shostakovich (Adrian Oetiker, piano), Centaur Records
 2012 “La Mer”, Claude Debussy, Sonata for Cello and Piano; Volodymyr Vynnytsky, piano; Suoni e Colori, France
 2014 Saint-Saens Concerto with Symphony orchestra of Lysenko Lviv Music Academy (Alexandre Brussilovsky, conductor), Suoni e Colori, France
 2014 “Concert”, Chausson Piano Trio, Alexandre Brussilovsky, violin; Volodymyr Vynnytsky, piano; Suoni e Colori, France
 2014 Cello Duos (Suren Bagratuni, cello), Centaur Records
 2015 “Tempo do Brasil”, Marc Regnier, classical quitar, V.Vynnytsky, piano; Reference Recordings
 2016 “Celtic Mass”, music of McGlynn and MacMillan; Taylor Festival Choir; Robert Taylor, Conductor; Delos Productions, Inc.
 2018 J. S. Bach Six Suites for Solo Cello; Sheva Collection

Published book

References

External links 
 
 Natalia Khoma Sheva Collection
 https://music.apple.com/us/artist/natalia-khoma-cello-volodymyr-vynnytsky-piano/213882411 Apple music.
 https://www.youtube.com/watch?v=ZkYcZ4G8m_Q YouTube.

Living people
Women classical cellists
1963 births
Ukrainian classical cellists
Moscow Conservatory alumni
Musicians from Lviv
Boston University alumni
Prize-winners of the International Tchaikovsky Competition
20th-century classical musicians
20th-century Ukrainian women musicians
20th-century women musicians
21st-century classical musicians
21st-century Ukrainian musicians
21st-century women musicians